Rick Sirvaitis is an advertising executive in New York City and currently involved as an advisor to PlanetXLaw, Access Legal Care, TAPPP, Pypestream and Vizability.  He is the former President of Storeboard Media LLC, a media sales company with the exclusive right to place advertisements on security pedestals in stores across the United States. He is also the President of his own consulting company: RS MediaMarketing LLC.  He has been a consultant to  clients like the NFL Network, the Television Bureau, Gemstar-TV Guide International and Google TV Ads among others and has most recently been retained as an Entrepreneur in Residence for Constellation Ventures. He is also the former President and Chief Operating Officer of GM Mediaworks (a division of Interpublic Group of Companies), the consolidated media buying unit for all General Motors divisions including network and cable television purchasing in New York City, as well as all print and Internet buying and a Cyberworks research and development unit in Detroit.

Advertising and media career – 2001
Sirvaitis began his career in advertising in the mid 1970s and has worked both buying and selling advertising media in traditional and alternative forms. Sirvaitis first became an executive in the industry with Turner Broadcasting Sales, Inc. (TBSI), when he became the Executive Vice President of news. He had previously spent five years in sales management at an NBC affiliate (WDIV-Detroit), three years with NBC Television Network Sales, three years at Blair television, and four years at Campbell-Ewald Advertising. In his position with TBSI Sirvaitis was responsible for all domestic sales for CNN/Headline News, the CNN Broadcast Networks, the CNN Airport Channel and all other place-based media, as well as all advertising sales for TBSI Internet properties.

After nine years with Turner Broadcasting Sales Inc., Sirvaitis left to become the President of Advertiser Sales for International Family Entertainment Inc. (which became Fox Family Worldwide, Inc. in 1997). During his five years with Fox Family Worldwide Sirvaitis became responsible for all ad sales for Fox Family Channel, Fox Kids Broadcast Network, Fox Kids Magazine, Fox Family Countdown Radio and Fox Kids Webnet. During this time he was also involved in the transition of the Family Channel, the development of two cable services in Latin America, and a TV ad sales firm in China.

In 2000, Sirvaitis was appointed the President and COO of Phase2media, a leading Internet advertising sales and marketing organization for branded Web sites.
In January 2001 he left to become the President and Chief Operating Officer of GM Mediaworks, which was solely dedicated to the media needs of General Motors and was part of the Interpublic Group of Companies In 2005, GM Mediaworks was incorporated into GM Planworks and he began his own consulting business RS Media Marketing LLC.  He has provided consulting to such clients as Google TV, the NFL Network, Invision, Gemstar/TV Guide, TRA and Beezag among others.  He was also a consultant to Constellation Growth Capital.

In 2006 he became one of the founding partners of StoreBoard Media, a new out-of-home media option that covers the security pedestals in retail establishments across the US (www.storeboards.net).   They are currently in over 25,000 locations including all Walgreen, CVS, Rite Aid, Family Dollar, and KMart stores, and deliver more than 2.0 billion impressions every four weeks.  In September 2009 Inc Magazine placed StoreBoards number 66 on their list of the 500 fastest-growing companies in the US. In April 2014 StoreBoard Media LLC was acquired by Advantage Sales and Marketing.
(NYSE:IPG).

Education, service, and awards
Sirvaitis  graduated with a B.A. in Advertising in 1971 and in 1976 received his M.A. in advertising from Michigan State University. The Michigan State University Department of Advertising named him the Outstanding Graduate Student of the Year in 1972 and Outstanding Alumnus in 1991. In 1985 he earned a law degree at Detroit College of Law and was admitted to the Michigan Bar in 1986.

Sirvaitis is currently on the board of The New Studio for the Visual Arts of Jupiter, Florida.  Sirvaitis is a past member of the Board of Directors of the International Radio and Television Society, The Stanwich Club in Greenwich, CT; and The Milbrook Owners Association. He is also a past chairman of the National Advisory Board of the Cable and Advertising Bureau, co-chairman of its Cable Industry Standards and Practices Committee, and received the Bureau’s Presidents Award in 1993.

References

External links
 Website of StoreBoards Media LLC

Year of birth missing (living people)
Living people
Businesspeople from Greenwich, Connecticut
Businesspeople from New York City
Michigan State University alumni
Detroit College of Law alumni
American advertising executives
American chief operating officers